Paul Beech (born 2 October 1965) is a former English cricketer.  Beech was a right-handed batsman who bowled right-arm medium-fast.  He was born in Hailsham, Sussex.

Beech made his debut for Cumberland in the 1992 Minor Counties Championship against Lincolnshire.  Beech played Minor counties cricket for Cumberland from 1992 to 1999, including 32 Minor Counties Championship matches and 12 MCCA Knockout Trophy matches.  In 1996, he made his List A debut against Middlesex in the NatWest Trophy.  He played three further List A matches for Cumberland, the last of which came against the Middlesex Cricket Board in the 1999 NatWest Trophy.  In his four List A matches, he scored 92 runs at a batting average of 23.00, with a high score of 42.  With the ball he took 2 wickets at a bowling average of 69.50, with best figures of 1/21.

References

External links
Paul Beech at ESPNcricinfo
Paul Beech at CricketArchive

1965 births
Living people
People from Hailsham
English cricketers
Cumberland cricketers